Interstate 35E may refer to:

See also
 Interstate 35W (disambiguation)

35E
E